Sainte Genevieve County, often abbreviated Ste. Genevieve County (French: Ste-Geneviève), is a county located in the eastern portion of the U.S. state of Missouri. As of the 2020 census, the population was 18,479. The largest city and county seat is Ste. Genevieve. The county was officially organized on October 1, 1812, and is named after the Spanish district once located in the region, after Saint Genevieve, patroness of Paris, France.

It includes Ste. Genevieve, the earliest settlement west of the Mississippi River outside New Spain, and one of the French colonial mid-Mississippi valley villages. It is one of the last places where Paw Paw French is still spoken.

History

Ste. Ste. Genevieve is the principal town and the county seat of Ste. Genevieve County with a population of around 5,000 people.

Ste. Genevieve was the first permanent civilized settlement in Missouri. The actual date of establishment is, like many other dates, connected to genealogy. Sources do not agree on the year of founding. According to Goodspeed's History of Southeast Missouri, and most of the descendants of the early settlers, 1735 is the most generally accepted date. Dr. Carl J. Ekberg, in his book, Colonial Ste. Genevieve, suggests that Ste. Genevieve was founded closer to 1750, based on interpretations of early letters, maps, and Catholic Church documents. Ste. Genevieve is about 250 years old.

The village of Ste. Genevieve was originally included in what was known as the Illinois Country. This was generally accepted to be all the land claimed by the French from the mouth of the Ohio River, north to the Great Lakes, and including the valleys of the Mississippi, Missouri, and Ohio rivers. The French established their seat of government for this territory in New Orleans. What is now Missouri became part of Upper Louisiana Territory. Early French explorers and settlers were known to have been in the Ste. Genevieve area in the very early 18th century.
 
Salt was a very important commodity at the time, used in the preservation of foods and curing of animal hides. The early French settlers were quick to exploit the salt springs on Saline Creek just south of Ste. Genevieve. Mineral explorations attracted Renault and La Motte to the area. Some of the earliest lead mines were named for La Motte in nearby Madison County.

Probably the biggest factor in the establishment of Ste. Genevieve was agriculture. Across the Mississippi River in Fort de Chartres and Kaskaskia, there was a growing need for agricultural land for the colonists. Across the Mississippi from Fort Kaskaskia was a large fertile section of river bottom, called the "Grand Champ" or Big Field. The "Old Town" of Ste. Genevieve was originally located here. It was approximately three miles south of the present site of Ste. Genevieve.

The village of Ste. Genevieve was originally an offshoot of the older French communities on the east bank of the Mississippi River—Cahokia, Kaskaskia, village of Chartres, Prairie du Rocher, and St. Philippe. The rich agricultural lands of the river bottoms were main attractions that lured most all of the early French pioneers to Ste. Genevieve. All the civil and legal business of Ste. Genevieve was transacted at Kaskaskia until about 1766 when the first commandant, Philippe de Rocheblave, was installed at Ste. Genevieve. By that time, more French migrants moved to the village from east of the river to escape British rule after France's defeat in the Seven Years War.

Townspeople relocated Ste. Genevieve to its present higher location from the river bottoms after the devastating floods of 1785. According to a sworn statement by Julien Labriere, in October 1825, "there were about fifty or sixty cabins in the old village. The old village was overflowed so as to be on the tops of houses. The water in many places was twelve or fifteen feet deep." The Mississippi River was the main travel route in the early decades, when  it served as a means of transportation for travelers both across, and up and down the river. The first commercial ferry between Ste. Genevieve and the Illinois side was established about 1800.

When Missouri was first being settled, the Osage Native Americans were the only tribe between the Osage River and the Mississippi. They were of the same stock as the Sioux and were hostile to the whites. Around 1787, the Spanish government, which had acquired the territory from France in 1762, brought in a band of Shawnee and Delaware Native Americans, who had been friendly to the French, to help protect the settlers from the Osage.

After the French had established and settled Ste. Genevieve, the first English-speaking American settlers started showing up in about 1788, and trickled upriver from Cape Girardeau and New Madrid. Starting about 1794, after the American Revolutionary War, newly independent Americans began migrating into the Ste. Genevieve District from Pennsylvania, Virginia, Kentucky, and Tennessee.

The flow increased in the early nineteenth century. In 1800, France reacquired Louisiana from Spain, and in 1803, Napoleon Bonaparte I sold it to the United States as the Louisiana Purchase. U.S. officials took over in 1804. They formed Ste. Genevieve County in 1812 as an original county of the Louisiana Territory, from the old Ste. Genevieve District. It is bordered on the east by the Mississippi River, on the north by Jefferson County, on the west by St. Francois County, and on the south by Perry County.

Starting around 1840, German Catholics began settling around New Offenburg and Zell. Shortly after wardGerman Lutherans began spreading into Ste. Genevieve from Perry County. But as late as 1930, most residents of Ste Genevieve were Catholic.

Geography
The county's northeastern border with Illinois is formed by the Mississippi River.

Adjacent counties
Jefferson County (northwest)
Monroe County, Illinois (northeast)
Randolph County, Illinois (east)
Perry County (southeast)
St. Francois County (southwest)

Major highways
 Interstate 55
 U.S. Route 61
 Route 32

National protected area
Mark Twain National Forest (part)

Mountains and hills
 Haney Hill
 Mertell Hill
 Pikes Peak
 St. Francois Mountains

Valleys

Bidwell Hollow
Corn Hollow
Henry Hollow
Lick Hollow
Morrison Hollow
Snell Hollow
Staples Hollow
Wolf Hollow

Demographics

As of the census of 2000, there were 17,842 people, 6,586 households, and 4,926 families residing in the county. The population density was 36 people per square mile (14/km2). There were 8,018 housing units at an average density of 16 per square mile (6/km2). The racial makeup of the county was 98.03% White, 0.72% Black or African American, 0.30% Native American, 0.16% Asian, 0.13% from other races, and 0.66% from two or more races. Approximately 0.74% of the population were Hispanic or Latino of any race.

There were 6,586 households, out of which 35.10% had children under the age of 18 living with them, 63.60% were married couples living together, 7.60% had a female householder with no husband present, and 25.20% were non-families. 21.80% of all households were made up of individuals, and 10.40% had someone living alone who was 65 years of age or older. The average household size was 2.66 and the average family size was 3.09.

In the county, the population was spread out, with 26.60% under the age of 18, 7.60% from 18 to 24, 27.90% from 25 to 44, 23.30% from 45 to 64, and 14.50% who were 65 years of age or older. The median age was 38 years. For every 100 females there were 101.20 males. For every 100 females age 18 and over, there were 100.50 males.

The median income for a household in the county was $48,764, and the median income for a family was $56,170. Males had a median income of $33,609 versus $18,875 for females. The per capita income for the county was $20,876. About 6.00% of families and 8.20% of the population were below the poverty line, including 11.30% of those under age 18 and 7.90% of those age 65 or over.

St.Genevieve County is home to the largest concentration of Fijian Americans in the mainland United States. With 359 persons being born in Fiji according to the 2010 United States census.

2020 Census

Education
Of adults 25 years of age and older in Ste. Genevieve County, 73.8% possess a high school diploma or higher while 8.1% holds a bachelor's degree or higher as their highest educational attainment.

Public schools
Ste. Genevieve County R-II School District - Ste. Genevieve
Bloomsdale Elementary School - Bloomsdale - (K-05)
Ste. Genevieve Elementary School (K-05)
Ste. Genevieve Middle School (06-08)
Ste. Genevieve High School (09-12)

Private schools
Sacred Heart School - St. Mary - (K-05) - Roman Catholic
St. Agnes Catholic Elementary School - Bloomsdale - (PK-08) - Roman Catholic
St. Joseph Elementary School - Ste. Genevieve - (PK-05) - Roman Catholic
Valle Catholic Schools - Ste. Genevieve - (K-12) - Roman Catholic
Valle Catholic Grade School (K-08)
Valle Catholic High School (09-12)

Public libraries
Sainte Genevieve County Library

Politics

Local
Historically, Democrats controlled local politics in Ste. Genevieve County.  However, in recent years this has changed.  In 2018, Claudia Stuppy became the first Republican elected in over 20 years to a countywide position, and longtime sheriff Gary Stolzer switched parties from Democratic to Republican.

State
Ste. Genevieve County is divided into two legislative districts in the Missouri House of Representatives.

 District 115 is currently represented by Elaine Gannon (R-De Soto). Consists of the extreme northern part of the county along the Jefferson County line.

 District 116 is currently represented by Dale Wright (politician) (R-Farmington). Consists of most of the entire county.

All of Ste. Genevieve County is a part of Missouri's 3rd District in the Missouri Senate and is currently represented by Elaine Freeman Gannon (R-De Soto, Missouri). The 3rd Senatorial District consists of Iron, Reynolds,  St. Francois, Ste. Genevieve and Washington counties and part of Jefferson County.

Federal

Ste. Genevieve County is included in Missouri's 8th Congressional District and is currently represented by Jason T. Smith (R-Salem) in the U.S. House of Representatives. Smith won a special election on Tuesday, June 4, 2013, to finish out the remaining term of U.S. Representative Jo Ann Emerson (R-Cape Girardeau). Emerson announced her resignation a month after being reelected with over 70 percent of the vote in the district. She resigned to become CEO of the National Rural Electric Cooperative.

Political culture

Unlike many other rural counties throughout Missouri, Ste. Genevieve was once a reliably Democratic stronghold in presidential elections. From 1948 to 2008, the county voted Democratic at every election except the national Republican landslides of 1952, 1956, 1972 and 1984. George W. Bush lost Ste. Genevieve County both times in 2000 and 2004; in the latter election, it was one of only four county-level jurisdictions (the independent city of St. Louis, St. Louis County and Jackson County) that voted for John Kerry. Unlike other rural counties throughout Missouri, Ste. Genevieve County was one of only nine counties in Missouri that favored Barack Obama over John McCain in 2008. The Democratic dominant streak in Ste. Genevieve County, however, was broken in 2012 when Mitt Romney carried it by three points over now-President Obama. This was the first time that a Republican presidential nominee had won Ste. Genevieve County since Ronald Reagan carried the county in his landslide reelection bid in 1984. In 2016, Republican Donald Trump, who received much more working class support than a typical Republican which could be seen across many working class and rural counties all across the country just like Ste. Genevieve county received 64% in the county, the most of any Presidential candidate since Lyndon Johnson in 1964 and the most of any Republican candidate ever.

Like most rural counties throughout Missouri, voters in Ste. Genevieve County generally adhere to socially and culturally conservative principles but are more moderate or populist on economic issues. Its character is similar to those of Yellow Dog Democratic counties in the South. In 2004, Missourians voted on a constitutional amendment to define marriage as the union between a man and a woman—it overwhelmingly passed Ste. Genevieve County with 75.25 percent of the vote. The initiative passed the state with 71 percent of support from voters as Missouri became the first state to ban same-sex marriage. In 2006, Missourians voted on a constitutional amendment to fund and legalize embryonic stem cell research in the state—it failed in Ste. Genevieve County with 56.22 percent voting against the measure. The initiative narrowly passed the state with 51 percent of support from voters as Missouri became one of the first states in the nation to approve embryonic stem cell research. Despite Ste. Genevieve County's longstanding tradition of supporting socially conservative platforms, voters in the county have a penchant for advancing populist causes like increasing the minimum wage. In 2006, Missourians voted on a proposition (Proposition B) to increase the minimum wage in the state to $6.50 an hour—it passed Ste. Genevieve County with 79.26 percent of the vote. The proposition strongly passed every single county in Missouri with 78.99 percent voting in favor as the minimum wage was increased to $6.50 an hour in the state. During the same election, voters in five other states also strongly approved increases in the minimum wage.

Missouri presidential preference primary (2008)

Then U.S. Senator Hillary Clinton (D-New York) received more votes, a total of 1,922, than any candidate from either party in Ste. Genevieve County during the 2008 presidential primary. She also received more votes than the total number of votes cast in the entire Republican Primary in Ste. Genevieve County.

Communities

Cities
Bloomsdale
St. Mary
Ste. Genevieve (county seat)

Census-designated places
Goose Creek Lake
Grayhawk
Ozora
Weingarten

Unincorporated communities

Avon
Brickeys
Chestnut Ridge
Clearwater
Clement
Coffman
Kinsey
Lawrenceton
Marlo
Mill
Millers
Minnith
Mosher
Needmore
New Offenburg
Pickel
Quarry Town 
River aux Vases
Rocky Ridge
Sprott
Thomure
Valley View
Womack
Zell

Ghost towns
La Saline
New Bourbon

Townships
 Beauvais
 Jackson
 Ste. Genevieve
 Saline
 Union

See also
Al Agnew
National Register of Historic Places listings in Ste. Genevieve County, Missouri

References

External links
 Digitized 1930 Plat Book of Ste. Genevieve County  from University of Missouri Division of Special Collections, Archives, and Rare Books

 
Missouri counties on the Mississippi River
1812 establishments in Missouri Territory
Populated places established in 1812